Kritika (Greek: Κρητικά) is a type of music from Crete.

Kritika may also refer to:
 Krittika, the name of the Pleiades star cluster in Indian astronomy and astrology.

Places
 Kritika, Corfu, a settlement in Corfu, Greece
 Kritika, Patras, a neighbourhood of the city of Patras in Achaea, Greece

People
 Kritika Kamra, Indian actress
 Princess Kritika of Nepal

Media
 Kritika (journal), Kritika: Explorations in Russian and Eurasian History, a journal published by Indiana University
 Kritika (magazine), Hungarian magazine
 Kritika Kultura, a journal published by Manila University
 Kritika Daidalika: 20 Selected Essays in Memory of James T. Hooker on the Archaeology, Epigraphy and Philology of Minoan and Mycenaean Crete, by Gareth Alun Owens
 Kritika & Kontext, a Slovak-English cultural journal by Samuel Abraham

Video games
 Kritika, an MMORPG on South Korean game portal Hangame
 Kritika: The White Knights, a.k.a. Kritika: Chaos Unleashed, phone app by Gamevil, released in 2014
 Kritika Online, by En Masse Entertainment, American adaptation of the MMORPG released in closed beta in 2017

See also
 Kratika Sengar, Indian actress